The women's 100 metre breaststroke event at the 2018 Commonwealth Games was held on 8 and 9 April at the Gold Coast Aquatic Centre.

Records
Prior to this competition, the existing world, Commonwealth and Games records were as follows:

Results

Heats
The heats were held on 8 April at 11:47.

Semifinals
The semifinals were held on 8 April at 21:03.

Semifinal 1

Semifinal 2

Final
The final was held on 9 April at 21:12.

References

Women's 100 metre breaststroke
Commonwealth Games
Common